Fabio Salerno (born 25 April 1979) is an Italian Roman Catholic priest who has served since 2020 as the second private secretary to Pope Francis. Prior to this, Salerno had been attached to the apostolic nunciature in Indonesia from 2015 to 2018 while serving in Strasbourg from 2018 until his appointment.

Life
Fabio Salerno was born on 25 April 1979 in Catanzaro. He completed his education in Rome first in the Pontifical Ecclesiastical Academy and then in the Pontifical Lateran University where he earned his doctorate in utroque iure. Archbishop Antonio Ciliberti ordained him to the priesthood on 19 March 2011.

Salerno served as the secretary in the apostolic nunciature in Indonesia from 2015 to 2018 until he served in the Holy See delegation to the Council of Europe from 2018 to 2020. It was following this that he began working in the Section for Relations with States in the Secretariat of State. Pope Francis appointed him on 1 August 2020 to be his second personal secretary to replace Yoannis Lahzi Gaid.

References

 

1979 births
21st-century Italian Roman Catholic priests
Living people
People from Catanzaro
Pontifical Ecclesiastical Academy alumni
Pontifical Lateran University alumni
Pope Francis